Lowden-Miller State Forest is a conservation area on  in Ogle County, Illinois, United States. The state acquired a  parcel of land for the forest in 1992, and the remainder of the land was acquired in 1993.

References

External links
DNR Lowden-Miller State Forest site
U.S. Geological Survey Map at the U.S. Geological Survey Map Website. Retrieved January 8th, 2023.

Illinois state forests
Protected areas of Ogle County, Illinois
Protected areas established in 1992
1992 establishments in Illinois